Riki Pambudi (born December 24, 1995) is an Indonesian professional footballer who plays as a goalkeeper for Liga 2 club Persiba Balikpapan.

Honours

Club 
Kalteng Putra
 Liga 2 third place (play-offs): 2018

References

External links
 Riki Pambudi at Soccerway
 Riki Pambudi at Liga Indonesia

1995 births
Living people
People from Kutai Kartanegara Regency
Indonesian footballers
Persiba Balikpapan players
Association football goalkeepers
Sportspeople from East Kalimantan